Sydney Gerrie (14 June 1927 – 9 May 2005) was a Scottish footballer, who played for Dundee and Hull City.

References

1927 births
2005 deaths
Footballers from Aberdeen
Scottish footballers
Association football forwards
Dundee F.C. players
Hull City A.F.C. players
Scottish Football League players
English Football League players
Inverurie Loco Works F.C. players